SECI or Seci may refer to:

 Southeast European Cooperative Initiative
 Solar Energy Corporation of India
 SECI model of knowledge dimensions
 Pio Seci, Fijian rugby league footballer